Ravuama Samo (born 19 August 1979 in Nadi, Fiji) is a Fijian rugby union player. He plays prop. He is 1.88 m tall and weighs 125 kg.

He was selected for Fijian team in June 2004, but he only debuted in the summer of 2005 versus Tonga. Overall, he played six matches for his national side, scoring no points.

He is a brother of an Australian international, Radike Samo.

References

Fiji international rugby union players
Living people
1979 births
Rugby union props
Fijian expatriate rugby union players
Expatriate rugby union players in England
Fijian expatriate sportspeople in England
Sportspeople from Nadi
I-Taukei Fijian people